Dexter House may refer to:

David Dexter House, Claremont, New Hampshire
Edward Dexter House, Providence, Rhode Island
Jeremiah Dexter House, Providence, Rhode Island
Dexter House (Houston, Texas), listed on the National Register of Historic Places in Harris County, Texas